Bree Morse (born December 11, 1991) is an American beauty pageant titleholder from Garden Grove, California, who was crowned Miss California 2015. She competed for the Miss America 2016 title in September 2015.

Pageant career

Early pageants
In August 2008, Morse entered her first Miss America system pageant, vying to become Miss Garden Grove's Outstanding Teen. She initially placed first-runner up to Emily Nguyen but was later elevated to Miss Garden Grove's Outstanding Teen 2009.

On August 20, 2011, Morse won the Miss Garden Grove 2012 title. She competed as one of 58 qualifiers in the 2012 Miss California pageant. Morse competed on a community service platform dubbed "Operation Gratitude" and performed a gymnastic dance in the talent portion of the program. She was not a top finisher in the pageant.

In February 2013, Morse won the Miss North County 2013 title. She competed as one of 61 qualifiers in the 2013 Miss California pageant. Morse competed on a platform of "Service for Sight" and danced in the talent portion of the program. She placed in the Top 12 contestants, but was not a finalist, and was named an Evening Wear Preliminary Winner, earning more than $2,000 in combined scholarship prizes.

On February 1, 2014, Morse won the Miss Orange County 2014 title. She competed as one of 54 qualifiers in the 2014 Miss California pageant. Morse competed on a platform of "Service for Sight" and danced in the talent portion of the program. She was named a Swimsuit Preliminary Winner, the Overall Interview Winner, and Miss Congeniality. Morse placed second runner-up to winner Marina Inserra, earning more than $5,500 in combined scholarships and prizes.

Miss California 2015
In January 2015, Morse was crowned Miss Orange Coast 2015. This win made her eligible to compete at the 2015 Miss California pageant, her fourth attempt at the state title. She entered the state pageant at Fresno's William Saroyan Theatre in June 2015 as one of 53 qualifiers. Morse's competition talent was tap dance. Her community service platform is in support of the National Alopecia Areata Foundation. She was chosen at the pageant's Miss Congeniality for the second consecutive year.

Morse won the competition on Saturday, June 27, 2015, when she received her crown from outgoing Miss California titleholder Marina Inserra. She earned more than $12,000 in scholarship money and prizes from the state pageant. As Miss California, her activities include public appearances across the state of California.

Vying for Miss America 2016
Morse was California's representative at the Miss America 2016 pageant in Atlantic City, New Jersey, in September 2015. In the televised finale on September 13, 2015, she placed outside the Top 15 semi-finalists and was eliminated from competition. She was awarded a $3,000 scholarship prize as her state's representative.

Early life and education
Morse is a native of Garden Grove, California, and a 2010 graduate of Pacifica High School. 

Morse is a 2014 graduate of California State University, Long Beach where she earned a Bachelor of Science degree in business marketing. While a student at CSU Long Beach, Morse became a member of the Delta Gamma women's sorority.

She most recently worked at Perkowitz + Ruth Architects in Long Beach, California.

References

External links

Miss California official website

Living people
1991 births
American beauty pageant winners
California State University, Long Beach alumni
Miss America 2016 delegates
People from Garden Grove, California